The Cell is an Australian play by Robert Wales. The setting is in a school for delinquent girls.

Background
The play debuted in 1966.

The play was published in 1971.

1968 Australian TV Version
It was adapted for television by the ABC in 1968, directed by John Croyston, and broadcast as part of the Seek and Destroy series. That was a short lived anthology series which consisted of four BBC plays and one Australian play - The Cell was the Australian play.

Australian TV drama was relatively rare at the time. The Cell was made when Australian TV stations were investing less in TV plays and more in serials.

Plot
Sister Catherine is in charge of a school for delinquent girls. She resents being passed over as Mother Superior of the Convent. When the new Mother Superior, Mother Denis, arrives,  there is a clash of personalities between the two. This is heightened when Sister Catherine sides with a young nun, Sister Lenora, who has broken the discipline of the convent. When the Mother Superior dies, Sister Catherine, who was in charge of the convent infirmary and drugs, comes under suspicion.

Cast
 Ruth Cracknell as Sister Catherine
 June Winchester as Mother Denis
 Betty Lucas as Sister Lenora
 Don Crosby

Production
Croyston decided to film the action all in one take "to enable the cast to hold the edge of emotional distraction".

Reception
The Sydney Morning Herald called the production "a victory for the local industry". 

The same reviewer later called it one of the best TV plays of the year saying "for writing and execution this play had class, high class."

1968 British Version
It was also adapted for television by the BBC in England as A Swallow's Nest in 1968.

References

External links

Australian plays
Australian television plays
1966 plays
1968 television plays